Rising Sun is the fifth studio album by the American hardcore punk band Stray from the Path. The album was released on August 30, 2011 by Sumerian Records.

Track listing

Personnel
 Andrew Dijorio - vocals
 Tom Williams - guitars
 Anthony Altamura - bass guitar, vocals
 Dan Bourke - drums
 Produced, mixed and mastered by Will Putney
 Engineered by Will Putney, Diego Farias and Taylor Voletz at Farias Production Studios and Threshold Studios
 Vocal production by Ash Avildsen and Shawn Keith
 Artwork and photo by Daniel McBride and Kathy Christensen
 Band photo by Karen Jerzyk

References

2011 albums
Stray from the Path albums
Sumerian Records albums
Albums produced by Will Putney